Chatham railway station is on the Chatham Main Line in England, serving the town of Chatham, Kent.

The station and most trains that call are operated by Southeastern. Following a timetable change on Sunday 20 May 2018, some trains are operated by Govia Thameslink.

There are two platforms, one for each direction and both capable of accommodating 12-coach trains.

There are tunnels at either end of the station: Fort Pitt Tunnel (428 yards) at the London end, and Chatham Tunnel (297 yards) at the country end.

History 

The station was opened on 25 January 1858, when the London, Chatham and Dover Railway (LCDR) (then known as the East Kent Railway) opened a single line eastwards to Faversham. Two months later (29 March 1858) the link with the North Kent Line at Strood was opened; and the new railway reached Dover Priory in 1861. The Chatham Dockyard branch connection is made near Gillingham.

As built the station had two platforms with the station buildings being on the Down side.  A note on the working drawings states that the station had to be visible from Fort Pitt.  About 1881 it was rebuilt with two island platforms, and the station buildings were moved onto the road bridge, then known as Rome Place. In 1958 the station was converted back to two platforms as part of the Kent Coast Electrification Scheme, Stage 1. The station had been electrified in 1939 but the 1958 scheme lengthened the platforms to 12 car EMUs, which due to the geography of the station - between two tunnels - necessitated the abandoning of the other platforms.

A modern entrance and booking hall replaced the originals in 1981. Further remodelling in the 1990s and 2000s has seen the ticket office moved twice, accompanied by the opening, closing and re-opening of retail areas. A small, general corner store also opened. The building is located at one side of the road bridge (now Railway Street) over the track, with a taxi rank located between the road and the building. Stairs lead down to the platforms. A cafe is located on the London bound platform. There is also a coffee shop located at the main entrance of the station.

In May 2021, work began on replacing the footbridge. The new bridge will have lifts enabling step-free access. This work is expected to be completed in spring 2022.

Asquith Xavier plaque

A plaque in the waiting room commemorates Asquith Xavier, a local resident who ended a colour bar at British Railways in London by fighting to become the first non-white train guard at Euston railway station in 1966.

Services 

The typical off-peak service in trains per hour is:

 1 tph to London St Pancras International
 2 tph to  via  and 
 1 tph to 
 2 tph to 
 1 tph to  via 
 2 tph to 

References

External links 

 Chatham station's page on the KentRail website

Railway stations in Medway
DfT Category C1 stations
Former London, Chatham and Dover Railway stations
Railway stations in Great Britain opened in 1858
Railway stations served by Southeastern
Railway stations served by Govia Thameslink Railway